Chub Lake may refer to:

Chub Lake (Dakota County), Minnesota
Chub Lake (Carlton County), Minnesota
Chub Lake (New York), in Hamilton County

See also
Lake chub